James S. Harlan (November 24, 1861 – September 20, 1927) was an American lawyer and commerce specialist, son of U.S. Supreme Court Justice John Marshall Harlan and uncle of Justice John Marshall Harlan II.

Biography
Harlan was born at Evansville, Indiana, graduated from Princeton University in 1883, and studied law in the office of Melville W. Fuller in 1884 to 1888. Admitted to the bar in 1886, he practiced law in Chicago as a member of the firms of Gregory, Booth, and Harlan, and Harlan and Harlan. From October 1888 to 1889, he served as the first law clerk to Chief Justice Fuller.

In 1901, President Theodore Roosevelt nominated Harlan as Attorney General of Puerto Rico and he served until 1903. He became a member in 1906, and chairman in 1914, of the United States Interstate Commerce Commission.

Personal life
In 1897, he married Mary Maud Noble in Washington, D.C.

See also
 List of law clerks of the Supreme Court of the United States (Chief Justice)
 Clarence M. York
 Everett Riley York
 Thomas A. Russell 
 Thomas H. Fitnam
 Frederick Emmons Chapin

References

External links
 
 

1861 births
1927 deaths
Princeton University alumni
People from Evansville, Indiana
Lawyers from Chicago
Lawyers from Washington, D.C.
Washington, D.C., Republicans
Political history of Puerto Rico
Law clerks of the Supreme Court of the United States
People of the Interstate Commerce Commission
Harlan family
19th-century American lawyers